Manuel Panaro Miramón (born 28 December 2002) is an Argentine professional footballer who plays as a forward for Aldosivi.

Career
Panaro began with local team Balonpié de Bolívar, before later joining Aldosivi. He progressed through their youth ranks, notably scoring for their reserves in a January 2020 friendly with Kimberley before making his competitive bow for them in February versus Banfield. Panaro was promoted into Guillermo Hoyos' first-team squad in the succeeding November, as he appeared on the bench for a Copa de la Liga Profesional match with San Lorenzo on 14 November; he did so four further times across the next four months. His senior debut arrived on 12 March in the Copa de la Liga against Central Córdoba; under Fernando Gago.

Personal life
Panaro comes from a footballing family. His great-grandfather (Cholo Azpiroz), grandfather (“Perro” Miramón), father (Guillermo Panaro), uncle (Emilio Miramón), brother (Agustín Panaro) and cousin (Ignacio Miramón) all played in the Argentine pyramid. On 13 January 2021, it was confirmed that Panaro had tested positive for COVID-19 amid the pandemic.
Actual novio de Paloma Alvarez

Career statistics
.

Notes

References

External links

2002 births
Living people
Sportspeople from Buenos Aires Province
Argentine footballers
Association football forwards
Argentine Primera División players
Aldosivi footballers